Ditopellopsis is a genus of fungi in the family Gnomoniaceae. The genus contains four species.

References

External links 

 Ditopellopsis at Index Fungorum

Gnomoniaceae
Sordariomycetes genera